Jamie Hunter is an English snooker player. She started playing on the World Women's Snooker tour in 2021 and has won two ranking tournaments, the 2022 US Women's Open and the 2022 Australian Women's Open.

Career
At the 2021 EBSA European Snooker Championship, Hunter won all three of her group stage matches, then defeated Caty Dehaene, Stephanie Daughtery and Anastasia Nechaeva to reach the final, where she faced 12-time champion Wendy Jans. Jans took a 3–0 lead in the best-of-seven s final, and won 4–1. In the women's team event, Hunter and Mary Talbot-Deegan won the title by defeating Rebecca Kenna and Emma Parker 3–2 in the final.

Hunter claimed the 2022 World Women's Billiards Championship title with a 304–148 victory against Snenthra Babu.

Hunter won her first women's ranking tournament in snooker at the 2022 US Women's Open. Having qualified for the quarter-finals by winning all three of her group matches, she eliminated Frances Tso 3–0 and then Talbot-Deegan 4–1. Hunter became the first transgender woman to win a ranking tournament by defeating Kenna 4–1 in the final.

She also took the following ranking tournament, the 2022 Australian Women's Open, with a 4–3 win against Jessica Woods in the final.

Personal life
Hunter started playing snooker after she sustained a serious ankle injury that prevented her from continuing to play football. She works in IT for a local council.

Performance timeline
World Women's Snooker

References

External links
Jamie Hunter at WPBSA SnookerScores

Living people
English snooker players
English players of English billiards
Year of birth missing (living people)
Female snooker players
Transgender sportswomen
English LGBT sportspeople
English transgender people